Nicholas Henry Darnell (April 20, 1807 – July 16, 1885) was an American politician in Tennessee and Texas. He was the only person to serve as Speaker of the House of the Republic of Texas House of Representatives and the State of Texas House of Representatives. He was a member of the Tennessee General Assembly prior to his move to Texas, and during the Civil War raised and led the 18th Texas Cavalry Regiment, which was also known by the name of "Darnell's Regiment."

Biography
Darnell was born on April 20, 1807 to Nannie Flewellen and Nicholas Darnell in Williamson County, Tennessee, where he was raised by his grandfather, William Flewellen. Darnell married Isabelle Cozart and the two would have seven children. At 28, he ran for the Tennessee General Assembly, but lost by 8 votes. Two years later, he won election unopposed, but resigned in 1838 to move to San Augustine, Texas.

In San Augustine, Darnell was sent to the Sixth and Seventh Congresses of the Republic of Texas. In the Seventh Congress, Darnell was elected Speaker of the House on November 24, 1842. After Annexation, Darnell narrowly lost the Lieutenant Governor's race to Albert Clinton Horton. While in San Augustine, Darnell helped to organize the Masonic Lodge there and held all offices of the Grand Lodge of Texas.

Darnell appears to have served in the House of Representatives of the First Texas Legislature, as he is listed as receiving one vote for Speaker in the election held to replace William Crump. He moved to Dallas in 1858, and was elected to the House for the Eighth (1859), and Ninth (1861) Texas Legislatures. Darnell was nominated for Speaker of the House in the Eighth Legislature on the second ballot, but was defeated by M. D. K. Taylor, 45 votes to 33. In the Ninth Legislature, Constantine W. Buckley was elected Speaker and served until he apparently resigned on December 7, 1861, at which time Darnell was elected Speaker.

After traveling to Richmond, Virginia, Darnell returned with orders to raise a cavalry regiment. He resigned as Speaker (as well as from the House) to raise the 18th Texas Cavalry.

After serving as Assistant Doorkeeper for the House of Representatives of the 14th Legislature (1874), Darnell was elected from Tarrant County to be a member of the House for the 15th Legislature (1876). Darnell represented Tarrant, Ellis, and Dallas counties in the Texas Constitutional Convention of 1876. He served as Doorkeeper and Assistant Doorkeeper for the 15th (1879) and 16th (1881) Legislatures.

Darnell died July 16, 1885 in Fort Worth and was buried in the Masonic Cemetery in Dallas, and later re-interred in the Pioneer Cemetery.

Notes

References

1807 births
1885 deaths
Speakers of the Republic of Texas House of Representatives
Speakers of the Texas House of Representatives
Members of the Texas House of Representatives
Members of the Tennessee General Assembly
Confederate States Army officers
19th-century American politicians
People from Williamson County, Tennessee
People from San Augustine, Texas
People of Texas in the American Civil War
Military personnel from Texas